Pierre Legrain (18 February 1920 – 20 June 2005) was a French athlete. He competed in the men's hammer throw at the 1948 Summer Olympics and the 1952 Summer Olympics.

See also
 Art Deco in Paris

References

1920 births
2005 deaths
Athletes (track and field) at the 1948 Summer Olympics
Athletes (track and field) at the 1952 Summer Olympics
French male hammer throwers
Olympic athletes of France
Sportspeople from Nord (French department)